Sarmur or Sar Mur or Sar Mowr may refer to:
 Sar Mur, Chaharmahal and Bakhtiari
 Sar Mur, Fars
 Sarmur, Ravar, Kerman Province
 Sar Mowr, Zarand, Kerman Province
 Sarmur, Khuzestan
 Sar Mur, Kohgiluyeh and Boyer-Ahmad
 Sar Mur-e Kukhdan, Kohgiluyeh and Boyer-Ahmad Province